Crotalaria burhia is a plant found in north-west India, mainly in the Thar desert region.

Uses
It is a good soil binder and has medicinal value. It is used to make ropes and sheds for animals in the desert and also used to make jhumpa (desert huts).  It is a food for goats.

References

L. R. Burdak (1982): Recent advances in desert afforestation, Dehradun, p. 66

External links

burhia
Flora of Pakistan
Flora of the Thar Desert